Al-Aziziyah, alternatively spelled as al-Aziziah, is the seat of the sub-municipality of its namesake, Baladiyah al-Aziziya and a residential neighborhood in southern Riyadh, Saudi Arabia, popular for its animal sale yards and wet markets. Spanned across 20.81 square kilometers, it's bordered by Southern Ring Road to the north and al-Kharj Road to the east whereas shares proximity with al-Shifa neighborhood to the west and ad-Dar al-Baida neighborhood to the south.

Pollution 
In 2013, Okaz reported that al-Aziziyah district is facing all kinds of pollution from three directions, the cement factory, slaughterhouses and sewages and was dubbed as the "nest of nests" of environmental pollution.

Traffic and transportation 
According to Al Riyadh in 2013, residents in al-Aziziyah complained of regular traffic congestion due to overcrowding of trucks and other cargo vehicles.

References 

Neighbourhoods in Riyadh